Rimowa GmbH, often stylized as RIMOWA, is a high-quality luggage manufacturer. The company was founded in 1898, in Cologne, Germany.

Rimowa suitcases are widely known for their parallel aluminium grooves, which have become characteristic of the brand. The company's headquarters and production have been located in Cologne for 120 years.

In October 2016, Rimowa joined LVMH, becoming the group's first German company. From 2017 to 2021, the company was managed by Alexandre Arnault. Hugues Bonnet-Masimbert took over as CEO in 2021.

History

1898: Paul Morszeck Koffer-und Lederwaren-Fabrik 
In 1898, Paul Morszeck and Heinrich Görtz founded the company under the name Görtz & Morszeck. By 1900, Paul Morszeck remained as the only director of the company.

1931: Registered Rimowa as a trademark 
In 1931, his son, Richard Morszeck, became involved in the company and registered the trademark Rimowa at the Reich Patent Office in Berlin. "Rimowa" is an acronym for Richard Morszeck Warenzeichen (with Warenzeichen meaning trademark).

1937: First suitcase in Aluminium 
In the 1930s, a fire in their factory burned most of their materials, leaving only aluminum. As a result, the company used metal for cases.

2000: First suitcase in Polycarbonate 
In 2000, the company introduced polycarbonate in box construction.

Rimowa produces its products in its own factories in Germany, Czech Republic, and Canada. In 2013, 5,800 cases were produced daily.

2016: Rimowa joined LVMH Group & Product Expansion 
In October 2016, Rimowa joined the LVMH Group and became its first German subsidiary, with Alexandre Arnault becoming CEO of the company. LVMH acquired an 80% stake for 640 million euros. Chief Brand Officer Hector Muelas and London branding design studio Commission created a new visual identity. In January 2021, Hugues Bonnet-Masimbert became CEO, coinciding with the launch of the brand's first line of backpacks and travel bags.

Rimowa identity evolution: 1898 - Today

Product Features 
Rimowa suitcases currently in production include the following features:
 The Multiwheel System first patented by Rimowa in 2001.
 TSA-approved locks first introduced in 2006 for global airport security compliance. 
 Telescopic handles with stage-free adjustment.
 Interior compartment equipped with two height-adjustable Flex Dividers that secure the contents of each suitcase.

Collaborations 
Rimowa has established several partnerships with well-known German brands, such as Lufthansa since 1998 for the brand's centenary, or with Porsche since 1999. As part of the partnership with Porsche, Rimowa regularly produces special series of its suitcases with specific colours or designs. Nevertheless, since 2017, Rimowa has made major changes in its strategy, moving from a product placement strategy to a strategy of close collaborations and long-term partnerships such as Fendi, Monocle, Moncler, Supreme, Off-White, Daniel Arsham, Anti Social Social Club, and the artist Alex Israel.

Supreme 
In 2018, New York skateboarding brand Supreme and Rimowa teamed up to create custom versions of the Original suitcase emblazoned with the Supreme logo. Made exclusively for Supreme, the limited-edition suitcase were available in Red and Black. In 2019, a second product drop was released, this time featuring Supreme's spider web design anodized into the aluminium surface of the Rimowa Original cases. Available in Cabin Plus and Check-In L sizes, the collaboration included a co-branded black leather luggage tag, custom lining, and matching drawstring shoe bag featuring the Supreme logo.

Off-White 
In 2018, Rimowa collaborated with streetwear label Off-White and its founder Virgil Abloh, also acting as Artistic Director of Louis Vuitton menswear. The capsule collection included a completely transparent Polycarbonate suitcase based on the Essential, titled "See Through", and an all-black Original case labelled with the words "Personal Belongings" in Off-White's signature block lettering and branded luggage belt. Due to its transparent design the "See Through" case forgoes interior lining and instead includes the Flex Divider system in black in addition to customised bags and an extra wheel set included in the product release.

Dior 
In 2019, Rimowa partnered with luxury fashion house Dior, and its Artistic Director of menswear Kim Jones, to develop a joint capsule collection of exclusive luggage items. The collection includes custom versions of the Rimowa Original Cabin and Original Trunk suitcases featuring the Dior Oblique design, a signature motif of the iconic house dating back to 1967. Also included in the collection was a revival of an archive piece - the Rimowa and Dior Hand Case modelled on the Rimowa "Piccolo" case of the 1990s - along with an all-new design called the Rimowa Personal offering a portable size and cross-body strap. Another highlight of the collection was the Dior and Rimowa Champagne case. The capsule collected debuted on the runway of the Dior's Men's Summer 2020 fashion show in Paris.

Daniel Arsham 
In 2019, contemporary artist Daniel Arsham and Rimowa collaborated on a special-edition art project. Drawing inspiration from the Rimowa brand archives in Cologne, Germany. Arsham created a numbered "eroded suitcase" series based on a vintage Rimowa Attaché briefcase. Similar to Arsham's "Future Relic" series (2013–2018) where he imagines a variety everyday objects as archaeological discoveries from a future, dystopian world. In May 2019, the number 008/500 of this special edition was sold for US$14,000 at auction house Sotheby's in New York city.

Ambassadors 
For the ‘Never Still’ global brand campaign, Rimowa enlisted a series ambassadors to promote their new brand identity.
Ambassadors featured in the ‘Never Still’ brand campaign include: 
 LeBron James, American professional basketball player for the Los Angeles Lakers.
 Rihanna, Barbadian singer, actress, fashion designer, and businesswoman.
 Patti Smith, American singer-songwriter, musician, author, and poet.
 Kim Jones, English fashion designer, creative director of Dior Men.
 Yuja Wang, Chinese professional classical pianist.
 Roger Federer, Swiss professional tennis player, he has won 20 Grand Slam singles titles.
 Virgil Abloh, American fashion designer, entrepreneur, artist, artistic director of Louis Vuitton's men's wear collection.
 Adwoa Aboah, British fashion model.
 Yoon Ahn, Korean-American designer, founder of Ambush and Dior Men's director of jewelry.
 Nobu Matsuhisa, Japanese celebrity chef and restaurateur.

Awards

References

External links

 Official website

Luggage brands
Manufacturing companies established in 1898
Luggage manufacturers
German brands
Manufacturing companies based in Cologne
1898 establishments in Germany
LVMH brands
Luxury brands
German subsidiaries of foreign companies